The twenty-fourth season of Saturday Night Live, an American sketch comedy series, originally aired in the United States on NBC between September 26, 1998, and May 15, 1999.

Cast
Before the start of the season, Jim Breuer, who had been a cast member for three seasons since 1995, left the show on his own terms. Following Breuer's departure, the show added three new featured players: stand-up comedian Jimmy Fallon, Chris Parnell, a performer with The Groundlings in Los Angeles, and Upright Citizens Brigade and Second City performer Horatio Sanz. Fallon, Parnell, and Sanz were all upgraded to repertory status during the following season.

Following the finale, no changes were made to the cast, and everyone returned for the next season.

Cast roster

Repertory players
Will Ferrell
Ana Gasteyer
Darrell Hammond
Chris Kattan
Tim Meadows
Tracy Morgan
Cheri Oteri
Colin Quinn
Molly Shannon

Featured players
Jimmy Fallon
Chris Parnell
Horatio Sanz

bold denotes Weekend Update anchor

Writers

Episodes

Specials

A Night at the Roxbury film

A Night at the Roxbury, a film based on the popular Roxbury Guys sketches, was released on October 2, 1998. Cast members Will Ferrell, Chris Kattan, Mark McKinney, Colin Quinn and Molly Shannon all appear in the film. The film did modestly well at the box office but was panned by critics.

References

24
Saturday Night Live in the 1990s
1998 American television seasons
1999 American television seasons
Television shows directed by Beth McCarthy-Miller